Veitchia is a genus of flowering plant in the family Arecaceae.

It contains the following species, all native to islands in the Pacific Ocean (Fiji, Vanuatu, Tonga and the Solomon Islands):

 Veitchia arecina Becc. - Vanuatu
 Veitchia filifera (H.Wendl.) H.E.Moore - Fiji
 Veitchia joannis  H.Wendl. (Joannis palm) - Fiji
 Veitchia lepidota  (H.E.Moore) C.Lewis & Zona - Solomon Islands
 Veitchia metiti Becc. - Vanuatu
 Veitchia pachyclada  (Burret) C.Lewis & Zona - Solomon Islands
 Veitchia simulans H.E.Moore - Fiji
 Veitchia spiralis H.Wendl. - Vanuatu
 Veitchia subdisticha (H.E.Moore) C.Lewis & Zona - Solomon Islands
 Veitchia vitiensis (H.Wendl.) H.E.Moore - Fiji
 Veitchia winin H.E.Moore - Vanuatu

From 1957 to 2008, the Adonidia genus had been merged into Veitchia until being returned to its original status as a separate genus. This is the origin of the Veitchia merrillii name.

References

 
Arecaceae genera
Flora of the Solomon Islands (archipelago)
Flora of Fiji
Flora of Vanuatu
Veitch Nurseries
Taxonomy articles created by Polbot